Fortunate Thulare (born 1 June 1994) is a Motswana footballer who currently plays as a defender for Jwaneng Galaxy.

References

1994 births
Living people
Botswana footballers
Botswana international footballers
Jwaneng Galaxy F.C. players
Association football defenders